The Center Open, or Abierto del Centro, is one of the major regional open golf tournaments in Argentina. Founded in 1927, it has always been held at the Córdoba Golf Club in Córdoba.

In 2001, Ángel Cabrera set the course record of 60 in the final round, and also equalled the tournament record aggregate score of 270, set by Ángel Franco in 1992. Roberto De Vicenzo won seven titles between 1943 and 1974.

Winners

Notes

External links
Coverage on the PGA Tour Latinoamérica's official site
Córdoba Golf Club - official site

Golf tournaments in Argentina
PGA Tour Latinoamérica events
Tour de las Américas events
Recurring sporting events established in 1927
1927 establishments in Argentina